Say It with Flowers may refer to:
 Say It with Flowers (1934 film), a British musical film
 Say It with Flowers (1952 film), a Swedish comedy film
 Say It with Flowers (novel), a 1960 novel by Gladys Mitchell